Anushavan Sureni Danielyan (born 1 August 1956) was Prime Minister of the Nagorno-Karabakh Republic (Artsakh) from June 1999 through September 2007. He was succeeded by Arayik Harutyunyan.

Early life 

In the 1990s, he was a vice-speaker of the Supreme Council of Crimea for the party Party of Economic Revival of Crimea.

References

External links
Ex-Prime Ministers - ANOUSHAVAN DANIELYAN, Official website of the Government of Nagorno Karabakh Republic

1954 births
Living people
Prime Ministers of the Republic of Artsakh
Georgian people of Armenian descent
Ukrainian people of Armenian descent